Loabi Nulibunas is a 2005 Maldivian television drama series developed for Television Maldives by Waleedha Waleed. The series stars Sheereen Abdul Wahid, Niuma Mohamed, Sheela Najeeb and Ali Seezan in pivotal roles.

Cast

Main
 Sheereen Abdul Wahid as Usha
 Ali Seezan as Imran
 Niuma Mohamed as Fazna
 Sheela Najeeb as Dheena
 Zeenath Abbas as Shadhiya
 Ahmed Saeed as Saeed

Recurring
 Aminath Rasheedha as Khadheeja; Usha's step-mother
 Hassan Afeef as Ihusan
 Koyya Hassan Manik as Dheena's father
 Neena Saleem as Sofoora
 Ibrahim Jihad as Shuad
 Lufshan Shakeeb as Siraj
 Hiyala as Lalla
 Husnee Mohamed as Farooq
 Chilhiya Moosa Manik as Hussain Saeed

Guest
 Hawwa Ibrahim as Hawwa; Shadhiya's mother (Episode 1)
 Ibrahim Shaheem as Moosafulhu (Episode 1)
 Abdulla Munaz as a doctor (Episode 2)
 Abdul Sattar as Imran's father (Episode 2)
 Hameed as Postman (Episode 3)
 Mohamed Arif as Fahumee (Episode 4)
 Nadhira as Health Worker (Episode 5)

Episodes

Soundtrack

References

Serial drama television series
Maldivian television shows